Four ships of the Royal Australian Navy (RAN) have been named HMAS Yarra after the Yarra River in Victoria.

, a River-class torpedo boat destroyer commissioned into the Australian Commonwealth Naval Forces in 1910, transferred to the RAN on its foundation in 1911, operated until 1929, and scuttled
, a Grimsby-class sloop commissioned in 1936 and was lost on 4 March 1942 while defending a convoy from seven Japanese warships
, a River-class destroyer escort commissioned in 1961 and in service until 1985
, a Huon-class minehunter commissioned in 2003 and in active service as of 2016

Battle honours
Five battle honours have been awarded to ships named HMAS Yarra:
Rabaul 1914
Adriatic 1917–18
Libya 1941
East Indies 1942
Malaysia 1964–66

References

Royal Australian Navy ship names